Kiki McDonough is a British jewellery designer. She owns a shop off Sloane Square in Chelsea, and her jewellery is in the collection of the Victoria and Albert Museum in Kensington.

Early life
Kiki McDonough's father was the owner of an antique jewellery shop on Bond Street in London.

Career
McDonough started designing jewellery in 1985. She opened her own shop on Elizabeth Street in 1989 and moved it to Walton Street in 1992. In 2008, she opened a shop on Symons Street off Sloane Square in Chelsea.

McDonough uses colourful gemstones. She draws inspiration from the ballet and often uses flowers in her designs.

A pair of earrings designed by McDonough is in the collection of the Victoria and Albert Museum. Her jewellery has been auctioned by Bonhams. Catherine, Duchess of Cambridge often wears her jewellery.

Kiki McDonough is the 2015 sponsor of the London Children's Ballet.

Personal life
McDonough is divorced from John Randle Siddeley, 4th Baron Kenilworth. They have two sons, William and Edward.

References

External links
Official website

Living people
Designers from London
British jewellery designers
Year of birth missing (living people)
Women jewellers